Simon Duncan Terry (27 March 1974 – July 2021) was a British archer from Grantham in Lincolnshire, England.

Early life
Terry was born on 27 March 1974 in Stirling, the son of Mike and Janice Terry. With the help of his father, Terry first began practising archery when he was eight years old. At the age of nine he won his first competition. At the time of the 1992 Summer Olympics, Terry was an unemployed roofer.

Comeback
After 13 years of retirement from archery, Terry began shooting again, and achieved high placings in major international events including the team gold at the World Cup 2007, stage two, in Varese, and an individual fourth place at the World Outdoor Championships in Leipzig, Germany being beaten by his teammate Alan Wills in a thrilling tie break where he scored a nine, and Wills took the bronze with a 10. Another one of his successes was at the fourth stage of the 2007 World Cup in Dover, England, when he was victorious against the young Mexican archer, Juan René Serrano. Serrano scored an eight in the tie and Terry scored a nine.

2008 Summer Olympics
At the 2008 Summer Olympics in Beijing Terry finished his ranking round with a total of 670 points, nine points behind leader Juan René Serrano. This gave him the seventh seed for the final competition bracket in which he faced Matti Hatava in the first round. Hatava was only the 58th seed, but managed to beat Terry with 105–104. Together with Wills and Larry Godfrey he also took part in the team event. With his 670 score from the ranking round combined with the 661 of Wills and the 657 of Godfrey the British were in fifth position after the ranking round. In the first elimination round they faced the Chinese team and got eliminated with 214–210. The Chinese went on to win the bronze medal.

2012 Summer Olympics
At the 2012 Summer Olympics Terry reached the last 32, losing to Dan Olaru. In the team event, Great Britain lost to Ukraine in the last 16.

References

1974 births
2021 deaths
Archers at the 1992 Summer Olympics
Archers at the 2008 Summer Olympics
Archers at the 2012 Summer Olympics
British male archers
Olympic archers of Great Britain
Olympic bronze medallists for Great Britain
Olympic medalists in archery
People from Grantham
Medalists at the 1992 Summer Olympics
Sportspeople from Lincolnshire